Argyrochlamys is a genus of flies in the family Dolichopodidae. It is known from the Afrotropics, the Oriental realm (Chagos Archipelago, Sri Lanka), and the southernmost part of the Palearctic realm.

Species
Argyrochlamys angolensis Grichanov, 2004 – Afrotropical: Angola
Argyrochlamys breviseta (Parent, 1939) – Afrotropical: Ghana
Argyrochlamys cavicola (Parent, 1929) – Afrotropical: Sudan, Djibouti; Southern Palearctic: southern Egypt, Oman
Argyrochlamys erythreus Grichanov, 2004 – Afrotropical: Eritrea
Argyrochlamys impudicus Lamb, 1922 –  Afrotropical: Seychelles, Mauritius; Oriental: Sri Lanka, Chagos Archipelago; Southern Palaearctic: Oman
Argyrochlamys marshalli Grichanov, 2010 – Afrotropical: Tanzania

References

Dolichopodinae
Dolichopodidae genera
Diptera of Africa
Diptera of Asia